Honoured Lady Zhang (367? - after 396) was a concubine of the Jin dynasty (266-420), She was a concubine of Emperor Xiaowu, whom she murdered in 396.

Biography
Honoured Lady Zhang was Emperor Xiaowu of Jin's favourite concubine. She had no children and the emperor's devotion to her (as well as Honoured Lady Zhang's jealous nature) has been blamed for his failure to appoint another empress after the death of Empress Wang, as well as his lack of children by other concubines. The emperor spent so much time with Honoured Lady Zhang that it reportedly became difficult for outsiders to gain an audience with him.

Murder of Emperor Xiaowu
The Book of Jin records that in 396, Honoured Lady Zhang was approximately 30 years old (by East Asian reckoning). Whilst she was drinking with the emperor one evening, he told her that he should discard her based on her age. Incensed, Honoured Lady Zhang went to bed with the emperor and killed him whilst he slept. Other written sources record that the emperor's comment was made in jest. After the murder, Honoured Lady Zhang bribed various people to declare that the emperor died in his sleep.

Media
She is portrayed by Deng Sha in the 2017 television series General and I

References

Notes

Works cited

Year of birth unknown
Year of death unknown
Jin dynasty (266–420) imperial consorts
4th-century Chinese women
4th-century Chinese people
Chinese regicides
Chinese female murderers